Ubuntu MATE is a free and open-source Linux distribution and an official derivative of Ubuntu. Its main differentiation from Ubuntu is that it uses the MATE desktop environment as its default user interface (based on GNOME 2), instead of the GNOME 3 desktop environment that is the default user interface for Ubuntu.

History
The Ubuntu MATE project was founded by Martin Wimpress and Alan Pope and began as an unofficial derivative of Ubuntu, using an Ubuntu 14.10 base for its first release; a 14.04 LTS release followed shortly. As of February 2015, Ubuntu MATE gained the official Ubuntu flavour status from Canonical as per the release of 15.04 Beta 1. In addition to IA-32 and x86-64 which were the initial supported platforms, Ubuntu MATE also supports PowerPC and ARMv7 (on the Raspberry Pi 2 and 3 as well as the ODROID XU4).

In April 2015, Ubuntu MATE announced a partnership with British computer reseller Entroware, enabling Entroware customers to purchase laptop and desktop computers with Ubuntu MATE preinstalled with full support. Several other hardware deals were announced later.

In Ubuntu MATE 18.10, 32-bit support was dropped.

Releases

Reception
In a May 2016 review Jesse Smith of DistroWatch concluded, "despite my initial problems getting Ubuntu MATE installed and running smoothly, I came away with a positive view of the distribution. The project is providing a very friendly desktop experience that requires few hardware resources by modern standards. I also want to tip my hat to the default theme used on Ubuntu MATE."

Dedoimedo reviewed Ubuntu MATE in July 2018, and wrote that "[Ubuntu MATE offers] a wealth of visual and functional changes…You really have the ability to implement anything and everything, and all of it natively, from within the system's interface".

Starting with the 22.04 LTS release, Ubuntu MATE included AI-generated wallpapers. These were warmly received by popular tech blogs, with OMG! Ubuntu exclaiming "I'm blown away by the quality of this AI-produced artwork" for the 22.04 release, and IT's FOSS News proclaiming the "beautiful" wallpapers were "a big highlight" of the 22.10 release".

See also
Comparison of Linux distributions
GTK
Linux Mint
MATE
Ubuntu Budgie
Ubuntu Unity
Xubuntu

References

External links

IA-32 Linux distributions
Linux distributions
Operating system distributions bootable from read-only media
Ubuntu derivatives
X86-64 Linux distributions